Umm Taqa is a district in central Qatar located in the municipality of Al-Shahaniya. It is an important Palaeolithic site in the peninsula.

Nearby settlements include Al Kharsaah to the south-west and Al Nasraniya to the north.

Etymology
Umm is the Arabic for "mother", and is commonly used as a prefix for geographical features. The second constituent, "taqa", is derived from the Arabic "tawq", which translates to "encircle". It was given this name because it is flanked by hills on all sides.

History
John Gordon Lorimer mentions Umm Taqa in his 1908 manuscript of the Gazetteer of the Persian Gulf, giving its location as "14 miles south of Dohat Fashshākh and 16 miles from the west coast". He also mentions "a masonry well, 25 fathoms deep, of good water" in the area.

See also
Archaeology of Qatar#Taqan culture

References

Populated places in Al-Shahaniya